This page is a list of help authoring tools, organized by operating system.

Mac

Windows

Cross-platform

References 

 
 
 
 
 

Online help